Syre: The Electric Album is the second extended play recorded by American rapper Jaden. It was released on July 12, 2018, through MSFTSMusic and Roc Nation under the partnership between Interscope Records and Republic Records. It is the follow-up to Smith's debut album Syre, released in 2017.

Background
The EP was announced in June 2018 after initially teasing his separate second album entitled Erys, which was released less than a year later on July 5, 2019.

Release and promotion
The promotional single, "Ghost" featuring Christian Rich, was released on June 22, 2018 for streaming and digital download, alongside a music video.

On July 8, 2018, the project was released exclusively on Jaden's Instagram on their IGTV feature on his 20th birthday, which lets users upload videos.

Track listing
Credits were adapted from Tidal.

Notes
 "B - Electric" features additional vocals by Lido, Jordyn Woods and Teo Woods
 "Ninety - Electric" features additional vocals by Lido, Teo Hudson and Harry Hudson
 "Fallen - Electric" features additional vocals by Lido and Odessa

References

2018 EPs
Jaden Smith albums